Heo Keon (born 3 January 1988) is a South Korean footballer who plays as midfielder for Bucheon FC 1995 in K League Challenge.

Career
He joined Hongcheon Idu FC in 2009.

He made his debut goal in professional league at the opening match of 2013 K League Challenge against Suwon FC.

References

External links 

1988 births
Living people
Association football midfielders
South Korean footballers
Bucheon FC 1995 players
K3 League players
Korea National League players
K League 2 players